The Zierikzeesche Nieuwsbode (1844−1998) was a newspaper in Zierikzee, Netherlands. Throughout its history it was published 2 to 4 times per week.

History
The Zierikzeesche Nieuwsbode was founded by Pieter de Looze, who was a book and newspaper printer, publisher, and seller in Zierikzee, operating from his home at Melkmarkt 2. During the years 18491861 , some of the content of the Nieuwsbode was reprinted in the United States as the Sheboygan Nieuwsbode, for Zeelanders taking interest in news from home.

Pieter de Looze was succeeded by his son Adriaan Johannes de Looze as printer and publisher of the Zierikzeesche Nieuwsbode. In 1869 the print operation, including the Zierikzeesche Nieuwsbode, was acquired by Ochtman, later known as Lakenman en Ochtman, then shortened to LNO. By 1 June 1889 the Nieuwsbode had driven out of business and taken over the business of its older rival, the Zierikzeesche Courant (founded 1979).

Due to the World War II the publication ceased in 1944. As the newspaper had been relatively cooperating with the occupation, it could not be published under its own name after the war was over. Instead it appeared as Vrije Stemmen van Schouwen-Duiveland (free voices of Schouwen-Duiveland). In 1947 the publication could return to its original name.

In 1998 the Zierikzeesche Nieuwsbode merged into the Provinciale Zeeuwse Courant and the Nieuwsbode ceased to exist.

Publication
 1844–1846: 3 issues per week, Pieter de Looze
 1846–1869: 2 issues, Pieter de Looze then Adriaan de Looze
 1869–1944: 3 issues, Ochtman then Lakenman & Ochtman
 1945–1947: 3 issues, temporarily titled Vrije Stemmen van Schouwen-Duiveland, Lakenman & Ochtman
 1947–1998: 4 issues, Lakenman & Ochtman then LNO

References

Defunct newspapers published in the Netherlands
History of Zierikzee
1844 establishments in the Netherlands
1998 disestablishments in the Netherlands